Frank Feely is an Irish nationalist politician in Northern Ireland.

Feely worked as a teacher in Newry.  At the 1973 Northern Ireland Assembly election, he was elected for the Social Democratic and Labour Party (SDLP) in South Down.  He held this seat at the Northern Ireland Constitutional Convention, and at the 1982 Assembly election.  In common with other SDLP members, he did not take his seat on the Constitutional Convention, and instead acted as an alternate at the New Ireland Forum.

He was elected to Newry and Mourne District Council in 1989 representing Newry Town, and has held his seat at each subsequent election.

In 1996, Feely was elected to the Northern Ireland Forum, representing Newry and Armagh, but he was not able to hold his seat at the 1998 Assembly election.

In the late 1990s, Feely was Vice Chairman of the District Council, and played a prominent role in Newry's successful bid for city status.  Following this, he became the first Mayor of Newry.

In November 2005, Feely and sixteen other nationalist councillors were jointly surcharged £10,000 and barred from public office for five years for refusing FAIR the use of Newtownhamilton Community Centre.  This was overturned on appeal, but left five of the councillors including Feely to share a large legal bill.

From 2007 on, Feely has worked as a field canvasser for Citizen's Campaign for the Environment in the United States.

Feely sits on the East Border Region Committee, the Carlingford / Foyle Loughs Commission and the Rural Communities Network (NI).

In 2015, during the Reform of local government in Northern Ireland, where Newry and Mourne District Council was made defunct and the new Newry, Mourne and Down District Council was established, Feeley, along with a number of other councillors decided not to run for election to the new "super council" and therefore became retired as of 1 April 2015.

References

Year of birth missing (living people)
Living people
Members of Newry and Mourne District Council
Mayors of places in Northern Ireland
Members of the Northern Ireland Assembly 1973–1974
Members of the Northern Ireland Constitutional Convention
Northern Ireland MPAs 1982–1986
Members of the Northern Ireland Forum
Social Democratic and Labour Party politicians